Mykhailo Levytskyi (or Mykhajlo Levitsky); 17 February, 1774 – 14 January, 1858) was the Metropolitan Archbishop of the Ukrainian Greek Catholic Church from 1816 until his death in 1858 and a Cardinal of the Catholic Church. He was from a Ukrainian Greek Catholic sacerdotal family and nobility with the herbu, de Rogale.

Life
Mykhailo Levytskyi was born on 17 February 1774 at Lanchyn, in Pokuttya region, the son of Rev. Stefan Lewicki (sic), the Greek Catholic priest in Lanchyn and Maria (last name unknown). He was one of at least eight children born to Rev. Stefan and Maria. Mykhailo's older brother, Gregory, became a priest also and served the village of Prysowce (Ukr: Prysivtsi) as its Greek Catholic pastor.  Mykhailo studied philosophy and theology in Lviv and later in Vienna where, after his (Priestly) ordination in 1798, he entered in force to the Greek Catholic parish of the St. Barbara and where he got a doctorate in theology. Returned to Galicia, became prefect of the Lviv Theological Seminary and later Professor of Scripture and Pastoral Theology at the University of Lviv.

In 1813 he was appointed bishop of the Archeparchy of Przemyśl and so consecrated Bishop on 20 September 1813 by Metropolitan Antin Angelovych. He participated to the Congress of Vienna

On 17 August 1815 Mykhailo Levytskyi was designated Metropolitan of Lviv by Emperor Francis II of Austria and so confirmed by Pope Pius VII on 8 March 1816.

He founded 383 parochial schools, cared for the publication of textbooks for them, and he supported the creation of educational associations of priests. Together with John Mohylnytskym he sought the introduction of teaching in the Ukrainian language in schools in Eastern Galicia.
Later defined as conservative, he was close to the Polish gentry circles, and enemy of modern trends in social and cultural life.
During the revolution of 1848, he supported the creation of the Supreme Ruthenian Council, which supported the Ukrainophile and pro-Habsburg positions of the Western Ukrainian Clergy, and encouraged the clergy to work on the education of the people

On 16 June 1856 he was created Cardinal priest by Pope Pius IX. He died in the Univ Lavra on 14 January 1858.

References

External links
 Mykhailo Levytskyi at Encyclopedia of History of Ukraine

1774 births
1858 deaths
People from Ivano-Frankivsk Oblast
People from the Kingdom of Galicia and Lodomeria
Ukrainian nobility
Ukrainian cardinals
Cardinals created by Pope Pius IX
Archbishops of the Ukrainian Greek Catholic Church
University of Vienna alumni
Bishops of Przemyśl
Metropolitans of Galicia (1808-2005)